Horatio George Anthony  Wright (1827 – 14 September 1901) was an Australian microscopist and surgeon. Wright was born in Maidstone, Kent, England and died in Sydney, New South Wales. In 1868 he attended the Prince Alfred, Duke of Edinburgh as a surgeon, after he was shot by Henry James O'Farrell.

See also

 Henry Chamberlain Russell, colleague in astronomy
 Archibald Liversidge, colleague in astronomy

References

Australian surgeons
Australian Anglicans
1827 births
1901 deaths
English emigrants to Australia